The Swindon Wildcats are a professional ice hockey team based in Swindon, Wiltshire, England. They play in the National Ice Hockey League (NIHL). Since their inception, the Wildcats have played their home games at the 1600-capacity Link Centre in West Swindon. The club was founded in 1986 as the Swindon Wildcats, shortly after the opening of the Link Centre.

The Wildcats were members of the English Premier Ice Hockey League (EPIHL) from 1997 to 2017. Due to the instability of the EPIHL following the culmination of the 2016–17 season, the Swindon Wildcats announced their intention to join the National League.

In their first season competing in the National League, the Wildcats won both the Autumn Cup and National Cup competitions, securing the club's first silverware since the 2000-01 season.
The following year the Wildcats won the regular season, becoming the 2018/2019 champions.

Logos and uniforms

Logos

The Wildcats' logo is an animated wildcat in the team colours of red and white.

Jerseys

The jerseys currently worn by the Swindon Wildcats are in red and white, the colours sported by the team since the 2008–2009 relaunch. They have worn the same jerseys (with a few small variations) since the 2008–2009 season. For the 2019/20 campaign, the Wildcats will have an alternate jersey that is predominantly black with red motifs.

The first Wildcats colours were black, yellow, orange and white. Blue and white were worn in 2006 and 2007.

Mascot

The official mascot for the Swindon Wildcats is an anthropomorphized wildcat by the name of Scratch. Scratch took over from his cousin Willie Wildcats during the 2021/22 Season. Willie Wildcat had been the mascot for the 'Cats since their return to the Wildcats name in 2004, after three seasons as the Lynx. However, he retired after a successful career at the Better Link Centre.

Season-by-season record

Club roster 2022-23
(*) Denotes a Non-British Trained player (Import)

2022/23 Outgoing

Retired numbers

6  Lee Brathwaite, D, 1992–1997, 1998–2009

7  Bryan Larkin, D, 1991–2001

9  Gary Dickie, F, 1993–1997

10  Steve Nell, F, 1986-1988, 1990-1996, 1997-1998, General Manager 2004–2021 (Now Managing Director)

14  Daryl Lipsey, F, 1986–1995

15  Scott Koberinski, F, 1989–1993

17  Ian Richards, F, 1987–1999

See also 
 Swindon Wildcats NIHL – amateur affiliated team playing in National Ice Hockey League South Division 2

References

External links

Swindon Wildcats Academy

Ice hockey teams in England
Sport in Swindon
Ice hockey clubs established in 1986
EPIHL teams
1986 establishments in England